Grapevines (Vitis species) are used as food plants by the caterpillars of several Lepidoptera (butterflies and moths). These include:

Monophagous species which feed exclusively on Vitis:
 Hepialidae
Zenophassus schamyl

Polyphagous species which feed on Vitis among other plants:
 Geometridae
 Peribatodes rhomboidaria (willow beauty) – leaves
 Hepialidae
Endoclita signifer
Zenophassus schamyl
 Lymantriidae
 Euproctis chrysorrhoea (brown-tail)
 Noctuidae
 Agrotis segetum (turnip moth)
 Amphipyra tragopoginis (mouse moth)
 Euxoa nigricans (garden dart)
 Noctua pronuba (large yellow underwing)
 Phlogophora meticulosa (angle shades)
 Xestia c-nigrum (setaceous Hebrew character)
 Tortricidae
 "Cnephasia" jactatana (black-lyre leafroller moth)
 Epiphyas postvittana (light brown apple moth)
 Eupoecilia ambiguella
 Lobesia botrana

External links 

Grapes
Viticulture
Lepidoptera